The 2018 Mallorca Open was a women's tennis tournament played on grass courts. It was the 3rd edition of the Mallorca Open, and part of the International category of the 2018 WTA Tour. It took place at Santa Ponsa Tennis Club in Mallorca, Spain, from 18 June through 24 June 2018. Tatjana Maria won the singles title.

Points and prize money

Point distribution

Prize money

WTA singles main draw entrants

Seeds

 1 Rankings are as of June 11, 2018.

Other entrants
The following players received wildcards into the main draw:
  Lara Arruabarrena
  Marta Kostyuk
  Svetlana Kuznetsova
  Francesca Schiavone

The following players received entry using a protected ranking into the main draw:
  Victoria Azarenka

The following player received entry as a special exempt:
  Kirsten Flipkens

The following players received entry from the qualifying draw:
  Sofia Kenin 
  Johanna Larsson 
  Antonia Lottner 
  Rebecca Peterson 
  Alison Riske 
  Ajla Tomljanović

The following players received entry as lucky losers:
  Viktória Kužmová 
  Stefanie Vögele

Withdrawals
Before the tournament
  Kirsten Flipkens → replaced by  Viktória Kužmová
  Aleksandra Krunić → replaced by  Stefanie Vögele
  Monica Niculescu → replaced by  Magda Linette
  Agnieszka Radwańska → replaced by  Kateryna Kozlova
  Zhang Shuai → replaced by  Markéta Vondroušová

WTA doubles main draw entrants

Seeds

1 Rankings are as of 11 June 2018.

Other entrants 
The following pairs received wildcards into the doubles main draw:
  Sorana Cîrstea /  Andrea Petkovic 
  Lucie Šafářová /  Barbora Štefková

Champions

Singles 

  Tatjana Maria def.  Anastasija Sevastova, 6–4, 7–5

Doubles 

  Andreja Klepač /  María José Martínez Sánchez def.  Lucie Šafářová /  Barbora Štefková, 6–1, 3–6, [10–3]

References

External links 
 

Mallorca Open
Mallorca Open
2018
Mallorca Open